Jens Robben (born 27 April 1983) is a German former professional footballer who played as a midfielder.

Playing career
Born in Haselünne, Robben made his debut at a professional level in the 2. Bundesliga for SV Eintracht Trier 05 on 8 August 2004, when he came on as a substitute for Matthias Keller in the 73rd minute in a game against Rot-Weiß Oberhausen.

In 2010, Robben rejoined SV Meppen. He announced his retirement from playing in May 2018.

Post-playing career
Following his retirement as a player, Robben took up a position as scout and video analyst at SV Meppen.

References

External links
 
 

1983 births
Living people
German footballers
Association football midfielders
SV Eintracht Trier 05 players
Rot-Weiß Oberhausen players
Berliner FC Dynamo players
2. Bundesliga players
Regionalliga players
3. Liga players